Juvva is a 2018 Telugu-language action masala film directed by Trikoti Peta and starring Ranjith  Somi and Palak Lalwani in the lead roles.

Cast 
 Ranjith Somi as Rana 
Palak Lalwani as Shruthi aka Aadhya
Ranjith Velayudhan as Basavaraj Patil
Murali Sharma as CI Viswanath, Shruthi's uncle
Sana as Viswanath's wife
Ali as Dr Alia Bhatt
Anand as Sivakrishna Hegde, Shruthi's father
Saptagiri as Rana's friend
Posani Krishna Murali as Pydiraju
Surekha Vani as Shyamala, Pydiraju's wife
Raghu Babu as Bhogam
Kalpalatha as Bhogam's wife
Prabhakar as Bhikshupati
Prabhas Sreenu as a goon
Himaja 
Bhadram

Production 
The film began production under the name JinthTha Tha, but S. S. Rajamouli and M. M. Keeravani advised the director to change the title because of its similarity to a song from Vikramarkudu (2006) will make the audience think that the film stars Ravi Teja. Debutant Ranjith Somi,  who previously starred in Nuvvu Nenu Okkatavudam, was signed as the main actor. The film is produced by Ranjith Somi's brother, Bharath Somi. Malayalam actor Arjun plays a negative role in this film, which will mark his Telugu debut. Chiranjeevi released the film's teaser.

Soundtrack

Release 
Telangana Today wrote that "Even after being a sensible story, direction and screenplay fail to turn the movie into a gripping one".

References

External links 

Indian action films
2010s masala films
Films scored by M. M. Keeravani
2018 action films
2018 films